Three – Love, Lies and Betrayal is an Indian Hindi suspense thriller film starring Ashish Chaudhary, Nausheen Ali Sardar, Akshay Kapoor and Achint Kaur. It was released on 21 August 2009.

Plot
Three – Love, Lies and Betrayal is a film about what takes place within a huge mansion that is located in Purple Lake, Scotland. The story revolves around Anjali Dutt (Nausheen Ali Sardar) the wife of Rajeev Dutt (Akshay Kapoor). Anjali is a violin teacher who runs the house with whatever she earns. She has a promising young student in Benji Smith, whose mother Tanya Smith (Achint Kaur) is a local Police Officer. Benji is required to leave the classes due to financial and other constraints but Anjali offers to Tanya to come to their house to teach him free of cost since Benji has great talent. This impresses Tanya a great deal. Rajeev, on the other hand, is facing a great financial loss in his business and has not been able to earn much and relies on Anjali's earnings. This leads to frustration in their relationship. Finally, Rajeev gains the courage to ask Anjali to sell the mansion and give him the money to invest in his business. This enrages Anjali because the mansion is the only connection she has with her late parents. However, she decides to help her husband and gives one portion of the mansion on rent. This brings Sanjay (Ashish Chaudhary) into the picture, who comes to stay as a paying guest. He soon finds out the tension between the couple and sympathizes with Anjali. Anjali then gradually gets attracted and falls in love with Sanjay. Is Sanjay's love for Anjali real? Has Anjali committed a blunder? Will she have to pay for it with her mansion......or even her life? What is written in her fate? Who will win in this game of love, lies and betrayal? Basically, Sanjay has been paid by Anjali's husband to trap her and then blackmail her with so that she pays him the money and in return the husband gets the money. The plan, however, backfires and ends with Rajeev, the husband dying and Sanjay being implicated for it. Tanya, along with the police cops gets Sanjay arrested for Rajeev's murder.

Reception
Upon release the film has met with lukewarm reviews. Mihir Fadnavis of India.com, who gave the film 2 stars out of 5, noted that "It won't be long before you figure out how the film is going to end, the clichés, packaged in some nifty cinematography keep piling on top of each other as the story progresses."

References

External links 
 
 
 Three: Love, Lies, Betrayal on Yahoo Movie

2009 films
2000s Hindi-language films
Films directed by Vishal Pandya